Aino Runge (17 June 1926 Tallinn – 3 August 2014) was an Estonian financial specialist, consumer defender and politician. She was a member of VIII Riigikogu.

Her daughters are painter and designer Sirje Runge and art historian Marika Valk. She was interred at Rahumäe Cemetery.

References

1926 births
2014 deaths
20th-century Estonian economists
Estonian Centre Party politicians
Members of the Riigikogu, 1995–1999
Women members of the Riigikogu
Recipients of the Order of the White Star, 4th Class
University of Tartu alumni
Burials at Rahumäe Cemetery
Politicians from Tallinn